Sébastien Lareau and Alex O'Brien were the defending champions, but lost in quarterfinals to Andrei Olhovskiy and David Prinosil.

Jonas Björkman and Byron Black won the title by defeating David Adams and John-Laffnie de Jager 6–7(6–8), 7–6(7–2), 6–0 in the final.

Seeds
All eight seeds received a bye into the second round.

Draw

Finals

Top half

Bottom half

References
 Official Results Archive (ATP)
 Official Results Archive (ITF)

Doubles